Majeed Ali (born 1 July 1944) is an Iraqi retired football defender who played for Iraq in the 1972 AFC Asian Cup. He played for the national team between 1970 and 1972.

References

Iraqi footballers
Iraq international footballers
1972 AFC Asian Cup players
Living people
Association football defenders
1944 births